7 Wonders of the Ancient World is a puzzle video game. It was developed by Hot Lava Games' Russian studio and published by MumboJumbo in February 2007. On April 2, 2009, the PSP version of 7 Wonders of the Ancient World was released on the PlayStation Store.

Gameplay
Players take the task of reconstructing the Seven Wonders of the Ancient World. In each wonder, there are 5 to 7 sub-levels of runes that players switch to form a row of 3 or more runes. There are two modes of play: Free Play and Quest Mode. In Free Play, players can choose to play any level they have completed in Quest Mode.

Reception

7 Wonders of the Ancient World received mixed reviews from critics upon release. On Metacritic, the game holds scores of 60/100 for the DS version based on 7 reviews, and 51/100 for the PSP version based on 10 reviews. On GameRankings, the game holds scores of 62.17% for the DS version based on 6 reviews, and 55.27% for the PSP version based on 11 reviews.

Sequels
In 2007, the first sequel of 7 Wonders of the Ancient World was released titled 7 Wonders II. None of the sequels to 7 Wonders of the Ancient World were released on PlayStation 2 or PlayStation Portable, but 7 Wonders II was released for the Nintendo DS in 2010. The next sequel in the 7 Wonders series of games was 7 Wonders: Treasures of Seven which was released in 2008 and released on the DS in 2011. 7 Wonders: Magical Mystery Tour was the next game in the 7 Wonders game series released in 2011 only on PC. The final game in the 7 Wonders game series was 7 Wonders: Ancient Alien Makeover released in 2012 only on PC. Due to the dwindling market of retail PC games in the United States, 7 Wonders Ancient Alien Makeover was only released digitally in the USA, although it was released physically in Europe as a collector's edition.

References

External links
 

2007 video games
MumboJumbo games
Nintendo DS games
PlayStation 2 games
PlayStation Portable games
Puzzle video games
Single-player video games
Video games developed in Russia
Windows games